The 1988 United States presidential election in South Dakota took place on November 8, 1988. All 50 states and the District of Columbia, were part of the 1988 United States presidential election. Voters chose three electors to the Electoral College, which selected the president and vice president.

South Dakota was won by incumbent United States Vice President George H. W. Bush of Texas, who was running against Massachusetts Governor Michael Dukakis. Bush ran with Indiana Senator Dan Quayle as Vice President, and Dukakis ran with Texas Senator Lloyd Bentsen.

South Dakota weighed in for this election as 1.5% more Democratic than the national average. This is the last of only four elections since statehood when South Dakota has voted more Democratic than the national average, an anomaly probably caused by the persistent crisis in the United States' farming sector during the decade.

Bush won the election in South Dakota with a 6-point margin. While South Dakota tends to lean conservative, the election results in South Dakota are also reflective of a nationwide political reconsolidation of the base for the Republican Party, which took place through the 1980s. Through the passage of some very controversial economic programs, spearheaded by then President Ronald Reagan (called, collectively, "Reaganomics"), the mid-to-late 1980s saw a period of economic growth and stability.

The presidential election of 1988 was a very partisan election for South Dakota, with more than 99 percent of the electorate voting for either the Republican or the Democratic parties, and only five candidates appearing on the ballot. While most counties turned out in this election for Bush, the highly populated centers of Brown County and Sioux Falls's Minnehaha County, voted in majority for Dukakis. Dukakis ran his campaign on a socially liberal platform, and advocated for higher economic regulation and environmental protection. Bush, alternatively, ran on a campaign of continuing the social and economic policies of then-President Reagan, which gained him much support with social and economic conservatives.

Results

Results by county

See also
 Presidency of George H. W. Bush
 United States presidential elections in South Dakota

Notes

References

South Dakota
1988
1988 South Dakota elections